Sool may refer to:

Sool, Somaliland, a region in eastern Somaliland
Sool, Switzerland, a village in the Swiss canton of Glarus
Sool (album), an album by Ellen Allien